Buried in Oblivion is the third full-length studio album by the Canadian metal band Into Eternity, released on February 10, 2004 by Century Media Records.  Track 6, "Spiraling Into Depression", became the band's first single and first video.

Reception

In 2005, Buried in Oblivion was ranked number 385 in Rock Hard magazine's book The 500 Greatest Rock & Metal Albums of All Time.

Track listing
 All songs written, performed, and arranged by Into Eternity
 All lyrics written by Tim Roth, Rob Doherty, and Chris Krall
 All songs 2004 Magic Arts Publishing

Personnel
Credits are adapted from the album's liner notes.

Into Eternity
 Jim Austin – drums/percussion & backing/death vocals
 Scott Krall – bass & backing vocals
 Rob Doherty − guitar & death vocals
 Tim Roth – clean/death vocals & guitar
 Chris Krall − clean/death vocals

Production and other
 Symphonic arrangements written and performed by Scott Krall
 Produced by Scott Krall and Johnny "Six Pack" Gasparic
 Recorded, mixed & mastered – April 21, 2003 to September 21, 2003 at Touchwood Studios, Regina, SK, Canada
 Mixed & mastered by Grant Hall and Johnny "Six Pack" Gasparic. Assisted by Into Eternity
 Engineered by Scott Krall, Johnny "Six Pack" Gasparic
 Artwork, Logo & Layout by Mattias Norén.
 Band photo by Darrol Hofmeister

References

2004 albums
Into Eternity (band) albums
Century Media Records albums